Richmond (Yorks) is a constituency in North Yorkshire represented in the House of Commons of the UK Parliament since May 2015 by Rishi Sunak, the current Prime Minister of the United Kingdom and leader of the Conservative Party.

Constituency profile
The constituency presents itself as a safe seat for the Conservative Party, which held it continuously since 1910 (if including the 11 years by the allied Unionist Party from 1918), and in the 2010 general election, Richmond produced the largest numerical and percentage majority for a Conservative, 62.8% of the vote. The Conservative MP and one-time Party leader William Hague held the seat from a by-election in 1989 until he retired from the Commons in 2015.  He had held the posts of Leader of the Opposition (1997–2001), Foreign Secretary (2010–2014) and Leader of the House of Commons (2014–2015). His successor Rishi Sunak served as Chancellor of the Exchequer from February 2020 to July 2022 and as Prime Minister from October 2022,  while Hague's predecessor Leon Brittan served as Home Secretary. The constituency has thus produced three consecutive MPs who served in the Great Offices of State and two who served as Leader of the Conservative Party.

The constituency consists of in the west the entire Richmondshire district and in the east the northern part of Hambleton District. It is a mostly rural seat with an affluent population.

History
Richmond was one of the parliamentary boroughs in the Unreformed House of Commons that dates to the middle of its long existence, first being represented in 1585. In modern times it has been an ultra-safe seat for the Conservative Party.

From 1983, the seat was represented by the cabinet minister Leon Brittan, after boundary changes saw his Cleveland and Whitby seat abolished; however, he resigned from the Commons in December 1988 in order to take up the position of vice-president of the European Commission.

1989 by-election
The ensuing by-election, held in February 1989, was won by William Hague: this was the last by-election won by a Conservative candidate during the Conservative Government of 1979–1997.  Hague's win has been attributed in part to the decision by the remnants of the Social Democratic Party (those members that objected to the merger with the Liberal Party the previous year) to contest the election as well as the newly merged Social and Liberal Democrats (who subsequently renamed themselves the Liberal Democrats).  The SDP candidate, local farmer Mike Potter, came second, and Hague's majority of 2,634 was considerably smaller than the number of votes (11,589) for the SLD candidate Barbara Pearce. Despite the Labour landslide of 1997, they did not come close to winning the seat, which stayed Conservative with a majority of 10,000. Hague retained the seat at every general election from then on, building the Conservative majority to 23,336, until his decision to step down at the 2015 election.

1992 change in main opposition candidate
In 1992, the Labour candidate until a few weeks before the election, David Abrahams, was deselected after a series of rows within the local party over his personal life and business interests. It emerged in 2007 that he used the name "David Martin" when dealing with tenants in his various rental properties in the Newcastle area, and that he had claimed that he lived with his wife and son, though he had never been married. Divorcee Anthea Bailey later told a local newspaper she and her 11-year-old son had posed as Mr Abrahams' family as part of a business arrangement so that Abrahams could create "the right impression".

Since 2001
At the 2001 general election, Richmond became the Conservatives' safest seat in the UK, both in terms of the actual numerical majority and by percentage, the seat being held by William Hague, then the Conservative leader. Although the numerical majority was surpassed by Buckingham at the 2005 election, Richmond has a smaller electorate and had a greater proportion of Conservative voters so retained the second largest percentage majority. Again in 2010, Richmond was the safest Conservative seat in the country, in terms of numerical and percentage majority. It has been represented since May 2015 by Rishi Sunak, the current Prime Minister of the United Kingdom and leader of the Conservative Party.

Boundaries

1918–1950: The Borough of Richmond, the Urban Districts of Kirklington-cum-Upsland, Masham, and Northallerton, and the Rural Districts of Aysgarth, Bedale, Croft, Leyburn, Northallerton, Reeth, Richmond, Startforth, and Stokesley.

1950–1955: The Borough of Richmond, the Urban District of Northallerton, and the Rural Districts of Aysgarth, Croft, Leyburn, Masham, Northallerton, Reeth, Richmond, Startforth, and Stokesley.

1955–1974: As prior but with redrawn boundaries.

1974–1983: As prior but with redrawn boundaries.

1983–1997: The District of Richmondshire, and the District of Hambleton wards of Appleton Wiske, Bedale, Brompton, Broughton and Greenhow, Carlton Miniott, Crakehall, Great Ayton, Hillside, Leeming, Leeming Bar, Morton-on-Swale, Northallerton North East, Northallerton South East, Northallerton West, Osmotherley, Romanby, Romanby Broomfield, Rudby, Sowerby, Stokesley, Swainby, Tanfield, The Cowtons, The Thorntons, Thirsk, Topcliffe, and Whitestonecliffe.

1997–2010: The District of Richmondshire, and the District of Hambleton wards of Appleton Wiske, Brompton, Broughton and Greenhow, Great Ayton, Leeming Bar, Morton-on-Swale, Northallerton North East, Northallerton South East, Northallerton West, Osmotherley, Romanby, Romanby Broomfield, Rudby, Stokesley, Swainby, and The Cowtons.

2010–present: The District of Richmondshire, and the District of Hambleton wards of Bedale, Brompton, Broughton and Greenhow, Cowtons, Crakehall, Great Ayton, Leeming, Leeming Bar, Morton-on-Swale, Northallerton Broomfield, Northallerton Central, Northallerton North, Osmotherley, Romanby, Rudby, Stokesley, Swainby, and Tanfield.

The Richmond constituency covers the Richmondshire district and the northern part of the Hambleton District. It is an affluent rural area with a significant commuter population, covering parts of the North York Moors and Yorkshire Dales National Parks, including Wensleydale and Swaledale. It contains the market towns of Northallerton, Richmond, Leyburn, Bedale, Hawes, and Stokesley, along with Great Ayton and other surrounding villages. It also includes the large army base Catterick Garrison.

Members of Parliament

MPs 1585–1640

MPs 1640–1868

MPs since 1868

Elections

Elections in the 2010s
:

:

:

Elections in the 2000s

Elections in the 1990s

Elections in the 1980s

Elections in the 1970s

Elections in the 1960s

Elections in the 1950s

Elections in the 1940s

Elections in the 1930s

Elections in the 1920s

Election results 1868–1918

Elections in the 1860s

Elections in the 1870s
Palmer resigned after being appointed Lord Chancellor and being elevated to the peerage, becoming Lord Selborne.

Dundas succeeded to the peerage, becoming Earl of Zetland.

Elections in the 1880s

Elections in the 1890s

Elections in the 1900s

Elections in the 1910s 

General Election 1914–15:

Another General Election was required to take place before the end of 1915. The political parties had been making preparations for an election to take place and by July 1914, the following candidates had been selected; 
Unionist: William Orde-Powlett
Liberal:

Election results 1832–1868

Elections in the 1830s

Dundas succeeded to the peerage, becoming 2nd Earl of Zetland and causing a by-election.

Elections in the 1840s
Speirs resigned by accepting the office of Steward of the Chiltern Hundreds, causing a by-election.

Colborne's death caused a by-election.

Rich was appointed a Lord Commissioner of the Treasury, causing a by-election.

Elections in the 1850s

Elections in the 1860s
Rich's resignation caused a by-election.

Palmer was appointed Attorney General for England and Wales, causing a by-election.

Dundas' death caused a by-election.

Pre-1832 election results

Elections in the 1830s

See also
List of parliamentary constituencies in North Yorkshire

Notes

References

Sources
D Brunton & D H Pennington, Members of the Long Parliament (London: George Allen & Unwin, 1954)
Cobbett's Parliamentary history of England, from the Norman Conquest in 1066 to the year 1803 (London: Thomas Hansard, 1808) 
 F W S Craig, British Parliamentary Election Results 1832-1885 (2nd edition, Aldershot: Parliamentary Research Services, 1989)
 J Holladay Philbin, Parliamentary Representation 1832 - England and Wales (New Haven: Yale University Press, 1965)
 Henry Stooks Smith, The Parliaments of England from 1715 to 1847 (2nd edition, edited by FWS Craig - Chichester: Parliamentary Reference Publications, 1973)
 The Constitutional Yearbook for 1913 (London: National Unionist Association,

Parliamentary constituencies in Yorkshire and the Humber
Constituencies of the Parliament of the United Kingdom established in 1585
Politics of North Yorkshire
Richmondshire
Richmond, North Yorkshire
Rishi Sunak
Constituencies of the Parliament of the United Kingdom represented by a sitting Prime Minister